Ricardo Barroso Agramont (born 29 February 1980) is a Mexican politician and lawyer affiliated with the PRI. He currently serves as Senator of the LXII Legislature of the Mexican Congress representing Baja California Sur. He was also candidate for Governor of Baja California Sur in 2011.

References

1980 births
Living people
People from La Paz, Baja California Sur
21st-century Mexican lawyers
Institutional Revolutionary Party politicians
Members of the Senate of the Republic (Mexico)
21st-century Mexican politicians
Politicians from Baja California Sur
Autonomous University of Baja California Sur alumni
Senators of the LXII and LXIII Legislatures of Mexico